The Local Government Act 2003 (c 26) is an Act of the Parliament of the United Kingdom. It made various changes to the administration of local government in the United Kingdom.  Although it contained mainly financial provisions, section 122 repealed section 2A of the Local Government Act 1986, the enactment prohibiting local authorities from 'promoting' homosexuality, in England and Wales.

It also created the concept of "business improvement districts".

See also
The Ethical Standards in Public Life etc. (Scotland) Act 2000, the Act which repealed section 2A in Scotland.

References
Halsbury's Statutes,

External links
The Local Government Act 2003, as amended from the National Archives.
The Local Government Act 2003, as originally enacted from the National Archives.
Explanatory notes to the Local Government Act 2003.

United Kingdom Acts of Parliament 2003
2003 in LGBT history